Buzhabad (also Romanized as Būzhābād) is a village in Fazl Rural District, in the Central District of Nishapur County, Razavi Khorasan Province, Iran. At the 2006 census, its population was 644, in 197 families.

References 

Populated places in Nishapur County